{{DISPLAYTITLE:C23H31N3O}}
The molecular formula C23H31N3O (molar mass: 365.51 g/mol, exact mass: 365.2467 u) may refer to:

 APINACA, or AKB48
 BU-LAD, or 6-butyl-6-nor-lysergic acid diethylamide

Molecular formulas